Gertrude Amy Roseby   (20 April 1872 – 27 December 1971) was an Australian Congregationalist lay leader as well as school teacher, principal and school owner.

Early life
Born in Dunedin, New Zealand on 20 April 1872, Roseby was the eldest of ten children born to Rev Thomas Roseby and his wife Sarah (nee Hooworth). Roseby's father was a Congregationalist minister. 

Roseby was privately tutored before entering the University of Sydney. She graduated with a Bachelor of Arts in 1895 with second class honours in logic and mental philosophy.

Teaching career
Roseby taught at Rockhampton Girls' Grammar School, Queensland for eight years before travelling to Britain for further study. She completed a Diploma of Pedagogy at the University of London (1905). In the following two years, Roseby taught at the Wyggeston School for Girls in Leicester before returning to Australia. 

In 1908, she became headmistress of Ascham, Darling Point. Roseby lived on site and served under principal HJ Carter. In April 1911, she bought Redlands School, Neutral Bay with her sister Mabel. Redlands was a school with 35 day girls and 8 boarders when she acquired it, and grew to 400 students under Roseby's direction. She also extended the grounds and buildings to accommodate the extra students. Roseby encouraged capable students to pursue university studies. The school was sold to the Church of England in 1945.

Roseby was chair of the Sydney Kindergarten Training College between 1946 and 1950. She was founder of Wybalena Hostel for Girls, Burwood and served as treasurer 1951–63. Roseby was also a member of the NSW Women's Inter-Church Council and the National Council of Women of New South Wales.

Activism
Roseby was a member of the Women's International League for Peace and Freedom and the Rotary Peace Fellowship. She was a life member of the Congregational Women's Association and served as president in 1942 to 1946.

Awards
Roseby was appointed an OBE in June 1958.

References 

1872 births
1971 deaths
Religious leaders from Dunedin
Australian schoolteachers
19th-century Australian women
Australian Officers of the Order of the British Empire
University of Sydney alumni
Alumni of the University of London
Australian Congregationalists